Carlos, rey emperador is a Spanish historical fiction television series, directed by Oriol Ferrer and produced by Diagonal TV for Televisión Española. The series is a sequel to the successful Isabel and is based upon the reign of Charles I. It was broadcast on La 1 of Televisión Española from 2015 to 2016.

Production 
The series is in the same continuity as television series Isabel and film La corona partida, which were also produced by Diagonal TV.

Plot 
The series tells the story of Charles I or Charles V, Holy Roman Emperor, one of the most powerful men Europe has met, the ruler of an empire as great in size as in diversity.

As the life of Charles of Habsburg is told since his arrival to Spain, it can be seen how the heir to the crowns of Germany, Burgundy, the Netherlands, the territories of the Crown of Aragon and its related Italian territories, and of the territories of the Catholic Monarchs in Castile, North Africa and the Americas, matures as a statesman and gets stronger in face of menaces around him and good and bad advice from his counselors.

Cast and characters

Episodes and ratings

References

External links 
Official site

2015 Spanish television series debuts
2016 Spanish television series endings
2010s Spanish drama television series
Television series about the history of Spain
Television series set in the 16th century
La 1 (Spanish TV channel) network series
Monarchy in fiction
Cultural depictions of Charles V, Holy Roman Emperor
Cultural depictions of Martin Luther
Cultural depictions of Leonardo da Vinci
Cultural depictions of Henry VIII
Cultural depictions of Catherine of Aragon
Cultural depictions of Hernán Cortés
Cultural depictions of Francisco Pizarro
Cultural depictions of Francis I of France
Spanish biographical television series
Cultural depictions of Fernando Álvarez de Toledo, 3rd Duke of Alba
Television series by Diagonal TV